Kofi S. Bonner is an American architect and planner who is known for the heading the redevelopment of the city of Emeryville, California. Bonner also has served as deputy executive director of the San Francisco Redevelopment Agency; the director of community & economic development and interim city manager for the city of Oakland, California; and chief economic policy advisor to San Francisco Mayor Willie Brown. In 1998, Bonner became executive vice president and chief administrative officer for the Cleveland Browns football organization of the National Football League. In 2004, Bonner was hired by MBNA and then in 2006 became director of urban land for Lennar. Currently he is regional president at FivePoint, a position he assumed when his previous role as president in Lennar's Bay Area Urban division transitioned into FivePoint in July 2016. In this role, Bonner oversees all land acquisition and urban development activities for FivePoint in northern California, including The San Francisco Shipyard and Candlestick Point, Treasure Island, and the Concord Naval Weapons Station.

Early life and career
Born in Ghana, Bonner received a Bachelor of Science degree with honors from the University of Science and Technology in Ghana. He then earned a Master of City Planning and a Master of Architecture from the University of California at Berkeley in 1987. Bonner then worked for the housing development company then known as Fei Tsen and Associates in Oakland and served as a member of the San Francisco city planning group called "SPUR" (San Francisco Planning and Urban Research). In 1988, Bonner was hired to replace out-going Steve Kaplan as redevelopment director for the City of Emeryville. It was there that Bonner captured local and national attention with several economic development efforts.

Oakland-based Kaiser Permanente was seeking land for a planned new headquarters facility in 1994. While the firm wished to remain in Oakland, finding land for Kaiser's plans proved politically and economically difficult. Observing these developments, Bonner courted Kaiser land development officials and eventually offered a  plot of land at 41st and San Pablo Avenue in Emeryville as the place where Kaiser could build its new home. Eventually Kaiser ended its plans, citing changes in the health care industry as the reason.

The Kaiser affair drew much praise and attention to Bonner, who continued to negotiate with developers to sell land and attract retailers like IKEA. Bonner also successfully established a reuse plan for the former Emeryville Judson Steel plant, which is now the Bay Street Shopping Center. And while Kaiser backed away from its plans to build a northern California headquarters in Emeryville, Bonner and the Redevelopment Agency attracted Pixar Animation Studios, which constructed its new home on the same property that was originally slated for Kaiser.

Bonner later held the positions of deputy executive director of the San Francisco Redevelopment Agency and director of community and economic development for the City of Oakland. He was appointed interim city manager for the City of Oakland in 1995. He served as chief economic policy advisor during the term of Mayor Willie L. Brown.

In 1998, Cleveland Browns President Carmen Policy offered the position of chief administrative officer of the Cleveland Browns to Bonner, who became the first African-American to hold such a title in the NFL. With the Browns, Bonner was responsible for the construction of the new Cleveland Browns Stadium and spearheaded the creation of the organization's website.  Bonner also sat on the NFL's Internet Committee.

In 2004, Bonner was hired to a business development position with MBNA, the credit card company. Expressing a desire to return to his city planning roots, Bonner became Director of Urban Land for Lennar in San Francisco. His role as President in Lennar's Bay Area Urban division transitioned into his current position as regional president for FivePoint in July 2016.

Bonner is a 2011 UC Berkeley College of Environmental Design Distinguished Fellow and a Member of the Brookings Institution’s Metropolitan Leadership Council, a non-profit public Policy "think tank" organization based in Washington, DC. He is also a member of Lambda Alpha International, a Land Economics society where he recently received the "2010 Member of the Year" Award. He currently serves on the boards of Bay Area Council where he co-chairs the Housing Committee, UC Berkeley’s College of Environmental Design Advisory Council, UC Berkeley Foundation's board of trustees, San Francisco Chamber of Commerce, Rock and Roll Hall of Fame Museum, and Museum of the African Diaspora.

Bonner is married and has three children.

References

Sources

External links
Faces of Business: Kofi Bonner

American architects
American city managers
Ghanaian emigrants to the United States
Living people
People from Emeryville, California
UC Berkeley College of Environmental Design alumni
Year of birth missing (living people)